Hati  or Saturn XLIII is a natural satellite of Saturn. Its discovery was announced by Scott S. Sheppard, David C. Jewitt, Jan Kleyna, and Brian G. Marsden on 4 May 2005, from observations taken between 12 December 2004 and 11 March 2005.

Hati is about 6 kilometers in diameter, and orbits Saturn at an average distance of 20,303 Mm in 1080 days, at an inclination of 163° to the ecliptic (165° to Saturn's equator), in a retrograde direction and with an eccentricity of 0.291, quite similar to Mundilfari's orbit. In March 2013, the synodic rotational period was measured by Cassini to about  hours. This is the fastest known rotation of all of Saturn's moons, and in fact the fastest known among all moons (including asteroid moons) for which a rotation period has been reliably measured. Like Mundilfari, it is very elongated in shape.

It was named in April 2007 after Hati, a giant wolf from Norse mythology, son of Fenrisúlfr and twin brother of Sköll.

References

 Scott Sheppard's Giant Planet Satellites Page (Saturn Satellite Data)
 Dave Jewitt: 12 new Satellites of Saturn May 3, 2005
 IAUC 8523: New Satellites of Saturn May 4, 2005 (discovery)
 MPEC 2005-J13: Twelve New Satellites of Saturn May 3, 2005 (discovery and ephemeris)
 IAUC 8826: Satellites of Jupiter and Saturn April 5, 2007 (naming the moon)
 Denk, T., Mottola, S. (2013): Irregular Saturnian Moon Lightcurves from Cassini-ISS Observations: Update. Abstract 406.08, DPS conference 2013, Denver (Colorado), October 10, 2013 (synodic rotation period)

Norse group
Moons of Saturn
Irregular satellites
Discoveries by Scott S. Sheppard
Astronomical objects discovered in 2005
Moons with a retrograde orbit